Ana Victoria Boccadoro Miguel (born December 8, 1983) is an American singer, songwriter, dancer and record producer. She is the daughter of Argentinian singers Amanda Miguel and Diego Verdaguer. In 2012 she was nominated for a Latin Grammy while most of her success is in Mexico.

Biography

2007-2010: Ready and AV  
Ana Victoria is the daughter of Latin American singer-songwriters Amanda Miguel and Diego Verdaguer. She was born on December 8, 1983, in Los Angeles, California. At the age of 13 she began working as a backup singer for her parents.

In 2007 she released her first album, Ready, co-produced with Rob Meister and released under her parents label DIAM Music distributed by Warner Music Group. It included the songs "Siempre pude ver" (Whenever I can see) and "P.D. Te amo" (PS I Love You) which reached the Mexican top 10 while the video for the first single won the Excellence Award at the Accolade Awards.

In April 2012 Ana Victoria released her second album, entitled "AV" co-produced by Axel Dupeyron. The eleven songs included a cover of her father's song  "Yo No Lloro por Llorar" (I Don't Cry for the Sake of Crying) and the singles "Nada" and "Sorry".

2012-2013: Latin Grammy Nomination and Color Amor 
In 2012 she was nominated in the category "Best New Artist" at the Latin Grammy Awards. In 2009 a live DVD and CD Ana Victoria: En Vivo, was released. In early 2013 she performed two duets: "Más vale tarde que nunca" with Christian Chavez , and "Simplemente amor" with Erik Rubin. The covers album Color Amor was released on August 21, 2013. It included her first song in English, a rendition of "I Belong To You" by Lenny Kravitz.

Discography

Studio albums
 2007 - Ready 
 2012 - AV 
 2013 - Color Amor

Live albums
 2009 - Ana Victoria: En Vivo

Singles
 2007 - «Siempre pude ver»
 2007 - «P.D. Te amo»
 2007 - «La sombra de este amor»
 2012 - «Yo no lloro por llorar»
 2012 - «Nada»
 2012 - «Más vale tarde que nunca» (with Christian Chávez)
 2013 - «Simplemente amor» (with Erik Rubin)
 2013 - «Si mañana no me ves»
 2015 - «Beso de Consolación»
 2016 - «Otoño»
 2017 - «La Reina»

Tours
 2013 - Color Amor Tour
 2016 - Herencia Romántica Tour

References

External links 

 

1983 births
Living people
American people of Argentine descent
Spanish-language singers of the United States
Singers from Los Angeles
American female dancers
Dancers from California
American women pop singers
American women singer-songwriters
21st-century American women singers
21st-century American singers
Singer-songwriters from California